William Henry McKeighan (July 1, 1886 – September 15, 1957) was a Michigan politician and state political boss based in Flint. Together with Detroit Mayor Ed Barnard and Grand Rapids politician-businessman Frank D. McKay form a Republican political triumvirate with ties to the Purple Gang of Detroit.

Biography
William H. McKeighan was born in 1886 in Cleveland. In Saginaw, he attended high school. He moved to Flint in 1908, initially working in a drug store. A year later, he opened his own pharmacy. McKeighan established a "base of operations at Leith Street and Industrial Avenue" where he owned a barber shop and pool hall, then organized his political machine.

McKeighan in 1913 was elected as a Flint city alderman at age 27. He was elected five times to the office of Mayor of City of Flint. His first time was in 1915 for a single 1-year term then again in 1922 defeating Marvin C. Barney, Citizens Party candidate. On April 3, 1923, he was defeated in the race for mayor by David R. Cuthbertson. He was elected as mayor again in 1927. A recall election to remove McKeighan in 1927 failed during which the police arrested recall supporters. In 1928, he faced conspiracy charges.

McKeighan was under investigation for a multitude of crimes and ticked off the rest of the city leaders that they pushed for changes in the city charter to a council-manager form with the council called commission. So, he ran the "Green Slate" of candidates who won in 1931 and 1932 that he was selected Flint Mayor in 1931 by the other City Commissioners. He entered the 1932 primary Governor of Michigan race. In 1940, he was a delegate to the Republican National Convention from Michigan. Along with his political ally, Frank D. McKay, McKeighan was charged with conspiracy to violate state liquor laws in 1945; he was given a judge-directed verdict of not guilty.

References

Mayors of Flint, Michigan
Michigan Republicans
1886 births
1957 deaths
20th-century American politicians